New Crusaders F.C. was an English association football club from Sidcup, Kent which folded in 1915.  It was a founder member of the Southern Amateur Football League for the 1907/08 season and were Champions in the 5 of the 6 seasons they competed in it up to them joining the Isthmian League for the 1913/14 season. In the 1905/06 and 1906/07 seasons New Crusaders competed in the FA Cup and the FA Amateur Cup.

References

Defunct football clubs in England
Southern Amateur Football League
Isthmian League
Defunct football clubs in Kent
Association football clubs disestablished in 1915